Nagar, Bangladesh may refer to:
 Nagar, Rajshahi Division
 Nagar, Barisal Division